James Randall Hunt (born January 3, 1960) is a former Major League Baseball catcher.

Hunt was raised in Alabama by his parents, Harold and Thelma Hunt. He attended Robert E. Lee High School in Montgomery, Alabama where he played several sports. According to the Montgomery Advertiser, he "came mighty close to signing a football scholarship at Troy State" but chose instead to play college baseball at Chattahoochee Valley Junior College. At Chattahoochee, he was converted to catcher and, after two years, continued his college baseball career at Alabama.

He was selected in the Major League Baseball draft after each of his three college seasons and finally signed with the St. Louis Cardinals, who selected him in 1981 after his first season at Alabama. Hunt began to develop a drinking problem toward the end of the 1982 season but eventually won "a six-month bout with alcoholism" in 1983 after seeking help for himself, at which point he began advancing through the minor league system. 

In June 1985, following an injury to catcher Darrell Porter, Hunt was called up to the Cardinals. On June 4, he recorded a hit in his first Major League at bat.

He had three hits in 19 at-bats in a total of 14 games. He moved to the Montreal Expos in the 1986 season. Hunt played in 21 games in 1986, with ten hits in 48 at-bats.

In a two-season career, he had a batting average of .194, with two career home runs and six RBI.

References

External links

1960 births
Living people
American expatriate baseball players in Canada
Arkansas Travelers players
Baseball players from Alabama
Chattahoochee Valley Pirates baseball players
Erie Cardinals players
Indianapolis Indians players
Louisville Redbirds players
Major League Baseball catchers
Memphis Chicks players
Montreal Expos players
Oklahoma City 89ers players
People from Prattville, Alabama
St. Louis Cardinals players
St. Petersburg Cardinals players
Alabama Crimson Tide baseball players